Alfredo Anselmo "Fredi" Martínez (born 6 September 1951) is an Argentine Radical Civic Union (UCR) politician. He sat in the Argentine Senate representing Santa Cruz Province from 2005 to 2017.

Martínez was educated in Río Gallegos, Santa Cruz and Ramos Mejía, Buenos Aires, then graduated as an architect from the National University of La Plata. He worked in construction, tourism and for family businesses, and was President of the provincial architects' society 1985-86.

From 1987, Martínez acted as adviser to the Radical councillors in Río Gallegos. In 1991 he was elected Mayor of Río Gallegos, and was re-elected in 1995 for a second term. In 2001 he was elected as a National Deputy, serving as secretary of the Public Works Committee, then President of the Housing and Urban Planning Committee. In 2003, Martínez stood for governor of Santa Cruz, coming in second with 27.4%, well behind Justicialist Sergio Acevedo with 71.7%.

Martínez was elected a Senator in 2005. In 2007 Martínez stood in the primaries to be the Radical candidate for governor of Santa Cruz but lost to businessman Eduardo Costa.

External links
Senate profile

References

1951 births
Living people
People from Santa Cruz Province, Argentina
Members of the Argentine Senate for Santa Cruz
Members of the Argentine Chamber of Deputies elected in Santa Cruz
Mayors of places in Argentina
Radical Civic Union politicians